Manjulal Ranchhodlal Majmudar (18 September 1897 – 11 November 1984) was a Gujarati language writer and scholar. He was awarded the Ranjitram Suvarna Chandrak in 1968.

Biography
Manjulal Majmudar was born on 18 September 1897 at Petlad, in the Anand district of Gujarat, India. Majmudar got his education at Vadodara, Gujarat. During his studies in 1914, a children's story titled Nano Vihari was published in Vasant magazine. In 1915, 'Narsinh Mehta's poem' was published in Vadodara 'College Miselini'. He completed his graduation in 1918 with Sanskrit and English Subjects. He completed his LL.B. in 1921 and started his career as a teacher at the National School, Vadodara. He started practicing as a lawyer but as his mind was turned to literature. In May 1928, he joined the Department of Education at Vadodara as the editor of Sayaji Sahityamala. At the 7th All India Oriental Conference held at Vadodara in 1933, he presented new discoveries of Vaishnava paintings in Balagopalastuti and Bhagwat Dasham Skandha. He joined Vadodara College as a professor in 1938. In 1943, he received his Ph.D. from the University of Bombay, writing a thesis on the subject of Cultural Background of Gujarat Art: Especially Miniatures. Later, in 1947, he received the Springer Research Scholarship for three years from the University of Mumbai for the research of Gujarat's slang, sculpture and architecture. He retired from service in 1952. He died on 11 November 1984 at Vadodara, Gujarat.

Writing
Besides edits, essays and texts, he has authored more than 400 articles, various magazines and publications on Indian culture and Gujarati language literature.

Edits
 Sudamacharitra (1922)
 Ranyagna (1923)
 Sahityamala (1928)
 Gujaratno Sankrutik Itihas (1929)
 Premananda yugni Salwari
 Gujgarati Kavyoni Saikavar Rachnao (Centuries-long compositions of Gujarati poems)
 Abhimanyu Aakhyan
 Jasamana Rasda - (for the 3rd edition of Ras Mala)
 Madhavanalakam-Kandala Prabandh
 Panchadanda ane Bija Kavyo
 Ranjung
 Lokvartanu Sahitya (Folk tale literature)
 Kavyavanit ane Nalakhyan
 Narsinh ane Mirana padono Marwadma prachar
 Gujarati Padysahityana svarupo (1954)
 Revane Tire (1956)
 Mirabai: Ek Manan (1960)
 Chronology of Gujarat (1960)
 Vallabh bhatt ni Vani (1962)
 Sadayvatsa Virprabandh (1963)
 Brehedevni Bhramargita (1963)
 Ganimni Ladaino PAvado (1964)
 Sahityakar Premanand:Navu Sampadan (1966)
 Dase Angalie Vedh (1967)
 Gujarai Padysahityana Svarupo: Madhyakalin tatha Arvachin

Honour 
He received the Narayan Mahadev Parmanand award in 1941 for promoting the poetic works of Narsinh Mehta and Mirabai through his article Narsinh ane Mirana padono Marwadma prachar. In 1929, he was awarded an M.A. by the University of Bombay for his article on the cultural history of Gujarat. He was awarded Ranjitram Suvarna Chandrak of the year 1968.

See also 
 List of Gujarati-language writers

References 

1897 births
1984 deaths
Gujarati-language writers
Writers from Gujarat
People from Anand district